Feardorcha Ó Conaill or Frederick William O'Connell (22 October 1876 – 19 October 1929) was a Church of Ireland clergyman, writer, and translator to and from Irish often under the pen name Conall Cearnach (after the legendary hero). He is known especially for editing the work of Peadar Ó Laoghaire.

Ó Conaill was born in Newtown, Leenaun, County Galway to William Morgan O'Connell, a Church of Ireland canon, and his wife Catherine Donnelly. Leenaun was in the Gaeltacht of Connemara, and William's parents were fluent Irish-speakers who taught him the language at the age of six. He attended  Trinity College, Dublin from 1891 and was ordained in 1902. He became rector of Achonry in 1907 and afterwards obtained a post as lecturer in Celtic languages and literature at Queen's University, Belfast.

Ó Conaill married Helen Young in 1905; they had three sons before she died of tuberculosis in 1925 after the couple moved to Dublin. He later married Marcella Graham, a French Catholic, and may have informally converted to Catholicism. He became assistant director of Radio Éireann in 1927, months before he was struck and killed by a bus while hailing a tram on Lansdowne Road, Dublin.

Bibliography
He translated works from  Spanish, Persian and Arabic.
 A Grammar of Old Irish Belfast, Mayne, 1912
 The Writings on the Wall Dublin, Gill, 1915
 The Age of Whitewash Dublin, Gill, 1921
 The Fatal Move and Other Stories Dublin, Gill, 1924; Swan River Press, 2021
 An Irish Corpus Astronomiae with R.M. Henry, London and Belfast, 1915
 Don Quixote by M. Cervantes (translation)
 The Midnight Court by Brian Merriman (translation)
 My Own Story by an tAth. Peadar Ó Laoghaire (translation)
 Three Shafts of Death by Seathrún Céitinn (translation)

References

External links
 

1876 births
1929 deaths
20th-century Irish Anglican priests
Irish editors
20th-century Irish translators
People from County Galway
Translators to English
Translators to Irish
Translators from Arabic
Translators from Irish
Translators from Persian
Translators from Spanish
Irish-language writers
Pedestrian road incident deaths